Geshan Wimaladharma (born 9 September 1992) is a Sri Lankan cricketer. He made his List A debut for Saracens Sports Club in the 2012–13 Premier Limited Overs Tournament on 9 December 2010. He made his first-class debut for Saracens Sports Club in the 2012–13 Premier League Tournament on 1 February 2013. He made his Twenty20 debut for Colombo Cricket Club in the 2014–15 SLC Twenty20 Tournament on 1 April 2015.

References

External links
 

1992 births
Living people
Sri Lankan cricketers
Colombo Cricket Club cricketers
Kalutara Town Club cricketers
Panadura Sports Club cricketers
Saracens Sports Club cricketers
Cricketers from Colombo